A'Cappella ExpreSSS is a professional a cappella group from Moscow, Russia, consisting of six members: soprano Viktoriya Shirokova, tenor Max Kostra, soprano Ekaterina Nadareishvili, baritone Ruslan Mustafin, сontralto Alla Goloviznina and bass Andrey Tunik.
 
The ensemble was founded in 2002, and recorded their debut album, entitled Magic Moment, the following year. In 2006 they signed a contract with Universal Music.
 
Apart from composing and performing their own music, the group's repertoire contains many well-known international and Russian hits, folk-songs from various cultures, and their own interpretation of classical music and international film scores.

Discography

2003 Magic Moment 

Intro
Not Today (Не сегодня)
My Favorite Things
People
Jazzed MozArt
Monotonously Rings the Handbell (Однозвучно гремит колокольчик)
Magic Moment Bossa
Katyusha (Катюша)
C Jam Blues
A`cappella ExpreSSS

2005 Middle of the River

2005 Voice meSSSage 
Middle of the River (Based on Henry Longfellow's lyrics)
Around the World ExpreSSS
Moscow Nights (Подмосковные вечера)
Love Me Do
Georgian Choral
A'Cappella Lounge
Magic Moment Bossa (bonus)
Copernicus
Steppe (Степь)
Not Today
Hit the Road Jack

2011 - DVD  "Live in Moscow"

Joint works 
 Two songs for Andrei Makarevich's tribute to Bulat Okudzhava: "Song About a Nightly Moscow (Песенка о ночной Москве)" and "Prayer (Молитва)"
 Magic Moment recorded for Jazz Province compilation
 Three songs for Venyamin Golubitsky's album Bus (Автобус) (music written by Alexander Pantykin): "People Cry at Night (Люди плачут по ночам)", "I Forgot (Я забыл)" and "Little Orchestra (Оркестрик)"
 Four songs for Mystery Sound's Christmas compilation: "Jingle Bells (Бубенцы)", "Little Fir is Born (В лесу родилась ёлочка)", "White Christmas (Иней Рождества)", "Brahms' Lullaby (Баю-бай)"
 Two songs for the Golden Melodies of Moscow (Золотые мелодии Москвы) compilation: "Moscow Nights (Подмосковные вечера)" and "Do You Hear, Moscow (Слышишь, Москва)"
 Three songs for Vitaly Moskalenko's film "One Life (Жизнь Одна)" "Oh, This Life Without Tomorrow (О, жизнь без завтрашнего дня)", "La Vie Ensemble" and "White Dog-Rose (белый шиповник)"
 Song "Thank You, Music (Спасибо, Музыка, тебе)" recorded for composer Mark Minkov's tribute album А знаешь, все еще будет...

Awards 
 "Ward Swingle Award" (2003) — first prize in the international a cappella competition "Vokal Total" (Jazz Category) in Graz, Austria
 CARA ("Contemporary A Cappella Recording Award") for "Best Jazz Album 2004" — "Magic Moment"

References

External links 
 A'Cappella ExpreSSS official site 
 Interview on Radio Mayak, few songs included
 Ensemble's profile on Universal Music Group site

2002 establishments in Russia
Musical groups established in 2002
Musical groups from Moscow
Professional a cappella groups
Russian jazz musicians
Russian musical groups